Sylvie Françoise Meis (born 13 April 1978), known for sometime as Sylvie van der Vaart, is a Dutch television personality and model based in Germany.

Career

Netherlands 
Born in Breda, Netherlands, Meis is partly of Dutch East Indies origin. She graduated from the University of West Brabant. Aged 18, she decided that she wanted to be a model and was cast for various shoots by casting agencies. After becoming interested in television, she gained popularity through assignments at FoxKids and music station TMF. She hosts several events at TMF, such as presenting the annual TMF-awards, and conducting interviews with international artists such as Britney Spears and Kylie Minogue. In addition, she features in video clips and the Dutch TV series Costa. She also introduced the Pure by Sylvie jewellery line to the Dutch market. Thereafter, she hosted the 2008 FIFA World Player of the Year award ceremony.

After being elected the Netherlands' Sexiest Female in 2003, she started a relationship with then Ajax footballer Rafael van der Vaart. Due in part to the fame from their individual careers, they soon became the Netherlands' most famous "football couple". Their fame grew after their marriage on 10 June 2005 and live coverage of the wedding on SBS6, a Dutch television channel, with the broadcast gaining high ratings in the Netherlands; Sylvie took Rafael's last name, van der Vaart.

Germany 

Meis and her then husband moved to Germany when he left Ajax to play for Bundesliga football club Hamburger SV. After her husband's 2008 transfer to Real Madrid, the van der Vaarts moved to Spain. Between 2008 and 2011, she was a judge on Das Supertalent, the German version of Simon Cowell's Got Talent series. In 2010 she took part in the third season of the German equivalent of Strictly Come Dancing, called Let's Dance. On 17 April 2010, Meis replaced the usual Deutschland sucht den Superstar judge Nina Eichinger for the final of the 7th season, after the latter was stuck in Los Angeles following flight restrictions as a result of the 2010 eruptions of Eyjafjallajökull. Between 2011 and 2017 Meis has been hosting the show Let's Dance together with Daniel Hartwich. In 2018 she was replaced by former participant Viktoria Swarovski and instead returned to Das Supertalent as a judge.

Following in the footsteps of famous entertainers such as Johannes Heesters, Linda de Mol and Rudi Carell, Meis is one of the most successful Dutch personalities active in Germany.

Personal life 

Meis is of partly Indo-European descent, her father being Dutch-Indonesian, her mother being Belgian.

Meis was in a relationship with footballer Rafael van der Vaart from 2003. On 10 June 2005, the couple married, and on 28 May 2006, their son Damián Rafael was born. Some of the media described the couple as the "new Beckhams" but both of them denied the claims saying that they prefer to just live a normal life.

On 16 June 2009, she announced that she had been diagnosed with breast cancer and had undergone surgery in May 2009. She finished post-op chemotherapy and has been cancer-free since. In the mid-2009, Real Madrid wanted to sell Rafael van der Vaart, but he decided to stay in Madrid because Sylvie was undergoing cancer treatments there.

In 2010, Meis admitted to having cheated on her husband, stating that van der Vaart found out through emails that she was having an affair with a KLM airline pilot which she believed was the beginning of the end of their marriage. On 2 January 2013, Meis acknowledged their separation after he had struck her in front of their guests. Their divorce was finalized in December 2013. On 12 April 2017, she became engaged to Charbel Aouad but the couple separated in October 2017.

Meis is fluent in English, Dutch, and German.

Filmography

Television and media appearances 
Meis has made several television appearances worldwide, including:
 Fox Kids (1999–2002, presenter)
 MTV Netherlands (2003, VJ)
 TMF Nederland (2003–2004, VJ)
 Das Supertalent (2008–2011, 2018, judge)
 Let's Dance (2010, participant)
 Let's Dance (2011–2017, presenter)
 Wedden dat ik het kan (2016, presenter)

Awards 
 2003: The Netherlands' Sexiest Female
 2011: Media Women of the Year
 2012: Bayerischer Fernsehpreis (together with Daniel Hartwich)

References

External links 

  
 
 
 
 

1978 births
Living people
People from Breda
Dutch people of Indonesian descent
Dutch people of Belgian descent
Dutch television actresses
Dutch female models
Association footballers' wives and girlfriends
Dutch expatriates in Germany
RTL Group people